Alvin and the Chipmunks Meet Frankenstein is a 1999 American animated dark comedy horror film produced by Bagdasarian Productions, LLC. and Universal Cartoon Studios and distributed by Universal Studios Home Video. It is directed by Kathi Castillo, written by John Loy and based on characters from Alvin and the Chipmunks and Mary Shelley's 1818 novel Frankenstein; or, The Modern Prometheus. This is the first of two Alvin and the Chipmunks direct-to-video films, and the first of three Universal Cartoon Studios productions to be animated overseas by Tama Production in Tokyo, Japan. This is the only animated Alvin and the Chipmunks film where the Chipettes do not appear.

It was followed up a year later by a standalone sequel, titled Alvin and the Chipmunks Meet the Wolfman.

Plot
The Chipmunks are performing at a theme park called Majestic Movie Studios. While taking a break from their concert, the Chipmunks get lost, and eventually get locked inside the park. They find their way to the "Frankenstein's Castle" attraction, where a real Dr. Victor Frankenstein is working on his monster. The monster is brought to life, and the doctor sends it in pursuit of the Chipmunks. In their escape, the monster retrieves Theodore's dropped teddy bear.

The monster follows the Chipmunks home and returns the bear to Theodore, who quickly befriends him. The Chipmunks learn that the monster (whom Theodore has nicknamed "Frankie") is truly good-hearted. Dave goes to the park to book a concert that night to celebrate the premiere of an anticipated film. Dr. Frankenstein tracks Frankie to the Chipmunks' home, and, angered at the monster's benevolence, kidnaps Alvin. Simon, Theodore, and Frankie hurry back to the park to rescue Alvin.

Dr. Frankenstein force feeds Alvin a potion and induces a powerful electrical shock. Alvin is released by Frankie, and after Simon swipes the doctor's potions book, the four of them escape back into the park. Shortly after, the process Alvin underwent takes effect, transforming Alvin into a zany cartoon monster. Alvin escapes to the premiere, causing chaos and havoc in his path. Using the potions book, Simon and Theodore mix an antidote using various food items from a buffet, and feed it to Alvin during his rampage. Alvin returns to normal, and the Chipmunks go to perform their concert.

Before the concert begins, Dr. Frankenstein attempts to transform Alvin back to his monster self, but is thwarted by Frankie, which leads to an explosion. After the smoke clears, Theodore introduces Frankie to the public, promising that Frankie will bring no harm if treated kindly. Meanwhile, Dr. Frankenstein is revealed to have been given the job of being the studio's mascot, Sammy Squirrel, much to his dissatisfaction, as he is trying to get the mascot's head off in a last ditch effort to kidnap Alvin.

Voice cast
 Ross Bagdasarian, Jr. as Alvin Seville / Simon Seville / David "Dave" Seville
 Janice Karman as Theodore Seville
 Michael Bell as Doctor Victor Frankenstein, Person in Mob and Delivery man
 Frank Welker as Frankie, the Frankenstein's monster, Man dressed up as Frankenstein, Sammy Squirrel, and Movie Director
 Jim Meskimen as Mr. Yesman, Person in Mob, Boy #2 and Police Officer #2
 Dee Bradley Baker as Tour Guide and Person in Mob
 Mary Kay Bergman as Miss Miller, Mother at the theme park, Little Boy, Boy #1, Female Bouncer 
 Kevin Michael Richardson as Bud Wiley, Man with Camera, Male Bouncer and Security Guard
 Susan Boyd as Police Officer #1, Mother at the playground and Olivia D’Handlotion

Production
The film was in production around 1998 alongside direct-to-video sequels to An American Tail. Universal Home Entertainment acquired the home video rights for The Chipmunk Adventure in the hopes of creating long lasting direct-to-video film series matching the success of The Land Before Time.

Songs
All original songs written by Michele Brourman and Amanda McBroom. Soundtrack available on MCA Records.
 "Things Out There"
 "If a Monster Came in Our Room"
 "If You Wanna Have Friends"
 "Dem Bones"
 "Sammy Squirrels Theme Song"

References

External links

 

1999 direct-to-video films
Alvin and the Chipmunks films
1999 animated films
1990s monster movies
Universal Animation Studios animated films
Universal Pictures direct-to-video animated films
Animated crossover films
American comedy horror films
American animated horror films
American direct-to-video films
1990s American animated films
Universal Pictures direct-to-video films
Films scored by Mark Watters
American supernatural horror films
Children's horror films
1990s children's films
1999 horror films
Films set in amusement parks
1999 films
1990s children's animated films
1990s English-language films